Empire Builders is an American old-time radio Western. It was broadcast on NBC-Blue from January 14, 1929, to June 22, 1931. The reference book Radio Rides the Range: A Reference Guide to Western Drama on the Air commented, "This may have been the first western drama on radio; it certainly was one of the most unique."

Format
The 30-minute weekly episodes "managed to combine romance and music in one program, along with gritty adventure and occasional bitter violence," featuring both real people from history and fictional characters. Episodes' eras ranged from the mid-1700s to the 1930s. Because the show was sponsored by Great Northern Railway, locales of the stories were usually in an area comprising California, Idaho, Montana, Oregon, and Washington state, the states served by the Great Northern Railway.

A narrator (the Old Timer) introduced each episode, and his "chuckles and characteristic colloquialisms" were regular features of the program.

As an example of the fare heard on Empire Builders, a two-part program that began on February 18, 1929, related the adventures experienced and the obstacles overcome during the Lewis and Clark Expedition. Among the difficulties included in the program was "the incident at Great Falls, where a cloudburst swelled the river and swept their encampment from the banks like so many flies."

Personnel
Virginia Gardner and Bob McGimsey starred in the original version of the program, when it originated at WJZ in New York City. When origination changed to Chicago, Don Ameche, Bernardine Flynn, and Harvey Hayes starred. The supporting cast usually included Obed "Dad" Pickard, Lucille Husting, and Bob White. Ameche and Flynn, both from the University of Wisconsin, were selected for the Chicago cast from hundreds of actors and actresses who auditioned for the program. Others who were heard on the program included Jack Daly.

Ted Pearson was the announcer, Don Bernard was the director, and Josef Koestner conducted the orchestra. Edward H. Bierstadt was a writer.

Wyllis Cooper was continuity editor.

References

External links

Logs
Log of episodes of Empire Builders from Jerry Haendiges Vintage Radio Logs
Log of episodes of Empire Builders from Old Time Radio Researchers Group
Log of episodes of Empire Builders from radioGOLDINdex

Scripts
Scripts of episodes of Empire Builders from The Generic Radio Workshop Vintage Radio Script Library

Streaming
"Armistice Day Reunion" episode of Empire Builders from the Internet Archive
Episodes of Empire Builders from Old Time Radio Researchers Group

1929 radio dramas
1929 radio programme debuts
1920s American radio programs
1930s American radio programs
NBC Blue Network radio programs
American radio dramas
1931 radio programme endings
Western (genre) radio series